is a passenger railway station in the city of Maebashi, Gunma Prefecture, Japan, operated by the private railway operator Jōmō Electric Railway Company.

Lines

Station layout
The station consists of a single side platform serving traffic in both directions.

Adjacent stations

History
Katakai Station opened on November 10, 1928.

Surrounding area
Maebashi High School

See also
 List of railway stations in Japan

External links

  
	

Stations of Jōmō Electric Railway
Railway stations in Gunma Prefecture
Railway stations in Japan opened in 1928
Maebashi